Dilawar (born c. 1979 – December 10, 2002), also known as Dilawar of Yakubi, was an Afghan farmer and taxi driver who was tortured to death by US Army soldiers at the Bagram Collection Point, a US military detention center in Afghanistan.

He arrived at the prison on December 5, 2002, and was declared dead 5 days later. His death was declared a homicide and was the subject of a major investigation by the US Army of abuses at the prison. It was prosecuted in the Bagram torture and prisoner abuse trials. US award-winning documentary Taxi to the Dark Side (2007) focuses on the murder of Dilawar.

Dilawar 
Dilawar was a 22-year-old Pashtun taxi driver and farmer from the small village of Yakubi in the Khost Province of Afghanistan. Dilawar was transporting three passengers in his taxi when he was stopped at a checkpoint by Afghan militia and arrested along with his passengers. The four men were detained and turned over to American soldiers, who transferred them to the Bagram Theater Internment Facility. Two of his passengers, Abdul Rahim and Zakim Shah, were reported to have suffered treatment similar to that of Dilawar. They survived Bagram and were later flown to the Guantanamo Bay detention camps at the US base in Cuba.
At Bagram, Dilawar was chained to the ceiling of his cell, and suspended by his wrists for four days. His arms became dislocated from their sockets, and flapped around limply whenever guards collected him for interrogation. During his detention, Dilawar's legs were beaten to a pulp. They would have had to have been amputated because damage was so severe. He died on December 10, 2002. He is survived by his wife and their daughter, Bibi Rashida.

Arrest 
The New York Times reported on May 20, 2005 that:

Torture 

The various accounts of torture have been detailed as follows:

 A black hood pulled over his head limiting his ability to breathe
 Knee strikes to the abdomen
 Over 100 peroneal strikes (a nerve behind the kneecap)
 Shoved against a wall
 Pulled by his beard
 His bare feet stepped on
 Kicks to the groin
 Chained to the ceiling for extended hours, depriving him of sleep
 Slammed his chest into a table front

The New York Times reported that:

On the day of his death, Dilawar had been chained by the wrists to the top of his cell for much of the previous four days. A guard tried to force the young man to his knees. But his legs, which had been pummeled by guards for several days, could no longer bend. An interrogator told Mr. Dilawar that he could see a doctor after they finished with him. When he was finally sent back to his cell, though, the guards were instructed only to chain the prisoner back to the ceiling. "Leave him up," one of the guards quoted Specialist Claus as saying. Several hours passed before an emergency room doctor finally saw Mr. Dilawar. By then he was dead, his body beginning to stiffen. It would be many months before Army investigators learned that most of the interrogators had in fact believed Mr. Dilawar to be an innocent man who simply drove his taxi past the American base at the wrong time.

Moazzam Begg claimed that while detained in the Bagram Theater Internment Facility, he was partial witness to the torture inflicted upon Dilawar.

Death 
The findings of Mr. Dilawar's autopsy were succinct.

Leaked internal United States Army documentation in the form of a death certificate dated 12 December 2002, ruled that his death was due to a direct result of assaults and attacks he sustained at the hands of interrogators of the 519th Military Intelligence Battalion during his stay at Bagram. The document was signed by Lt. Col. Elizabeth A. Rouse of the U.S. Air Force, a pathologist with the Armed Forces Institute of Pathology in Washington DC, and listed as its finding that the "mode of death" was "homicide," and not "natural," "accident" or "suicide" and that the cause of death was "blunt-force injuries to lower extremities complicating coronary artery disease".

A subsequent autopsy revealed that his legs had been "pulpified," and that even if Dilawar had survived, it would have been necessary to amputate his legs.

According to the death certificate shown in the documentary Taxi to the Dark Side, the box marked Homicide had been checked as the ultimate cause of death. However, the military had so far publicly claimed that Dilawar had died from natural causes. It was only by accident that the death certificate was leaked when New York Times reporter Carlotta Gall managed to track down Dilawar's family in Yakubi where Dilawar's brother, Shahpoor, showed her a folded paper he had received with Dilawar's body which he could not read because it was in English; it was the death certificate.

Culpability 

In August 2005, lead interrogator Specialist Glendale C. Walls of the U.S. Army pleaded guilty at a military court to pushing Dilawar against a wall and doing nothing to prevent other soldiers from abusing him. Walls was subsequently sentenced to two months in a military prison. Two other soldiers convicted in connection with the case escaped custodial sentences. The sentences were criticized by Human Rights Watch.

In March 2006, the CBS News program, "60 Minutes" investigated the deaths of two Afghan prisoners, including Dilawar, revealing that authorization for the abuse came from the "very top of the United States government". 60 Minutes correspondent Scott Pelley interviewed retired Army Colonel Lawrence Wilkerson, who was appointed chief of staff by Secretary of State Colin Powell in 2002, during George W. Bush's first administration. Willie V. Brand, one of the soldiers convicted of assault and maiming in the deaths of the two prisoners, and Brand's commanding officer, Capt. Christopher Beiring, were also featured in the program. Wilkerson told "60 Minutes" that he could "smell" a cover-up and was asked by Powell to investigate how American soldiers had come to use torture and stated; "I was developing the picture as to how this all got started in the first place, and that alarmed me as much as the abuse itself because it looked like authorization for the abuse went to the very top of the United States government". Brand and Beiring confirmed that several of their leaders had witnessed and knew about the abuse and torture of the prisoners.

Beiring and Brand showed no remorse when recounting the torture. Beiring was charged with dereliction of duty, a charge that was later dropped. Brand was convicted at his court martial, but rather than the 16 years in prison he was facing from the charges brought against him, he was given a reduction in rank.

In August 2005, Sgt. Selena M. Salcedo, an interrogator with the 519th Military Intelligence Battalion, admitted to mistreating Dilawar. In a military court Salcedo pleaded guilty to dereliction of duty and assault, admitting she kicked the prisoner, grabbed his head and forced him against a wall several times. Two related charges were dropped and she was reduced in rank to corporal or specialist, given a letter of reprimand and docked $250 a month in pay for four months. She could have received a year in prison, loss of a year's pay, reduction in rank to private, and a bad-conduct discharge.

2007 inquiry in civil court

In July 2007, a federal grand jury opened a civil inquiry into the Bagram abuse.
Alicia A. Caldwell, writing in the Huffington Post, quoted a former military defense lawyer, named Michael Waddington, who said:

Duane M. Grubb, Darin Broady, Christopher Greatorex and Christopher Beiring, four of the soldiers who served at the center at the time of the deaths, acknowledge that they had been called before the grand jury.
They were reported to have waived immunity.

References

External links
 Amnesty International 16 July 2003 "Detainees undergoing interrogation by agents of the CIA in the Bagram Air Base have allegedly been subjected to "stress and duress" techniques, including prolonged standing or kneeling, hooding, blindfolding with spray-painted goggles, being kept in painful or awkward positions, sleep deprivation, and 24-hour lighting. Two detainees died at Bagram Air Base in December 2002 in circumstances suggesting that they may have been beaten. The military investigation into the deaths was still ongoing in late June, according to the Pentagon."
 Karzai Shock at US Afghan 'Abuse' BBC News, May 21, 2005.
 Army Faltered in Investigating Detainee Abuse
 Editorial: Patterns of Abuse, The New York Times, May 23, 2005.
 U.S. 'Thumbs Its Nose' at Rights, Amnesty Says by Alan Cowell, The New York Times, May 26, 2005.
 Failures of Imagination, Columbia Journalism Review, 2005, issue 5 
 US Soldier Jailed in Afghan Abuse BBC News, August 24, 2005.
 Washington Post – Down a Dark Road by Richard Leiby on April 27, 2007

Year of birth unknown
2002 deaths
Afghan extrajudicial prisoners of the United States
Afghan murder victims
Afghan people who died in prison custody
Afghan taxi drivers
Afghan torture victims
Bagram Theater Internment Facility detainees
Extrajudicial prisoners killed while in United States custody
Pashtun people
Prisoners who died in United States military detention
Victims of human rights abuses
1979 births